Statistics of Czechoslovak First League in the 1929–30 season.

Overview
It was contested by eight teams, and Slavia Prague won the championship. František Kloz was the league's top scorer with 15 goals.

League standings

Results

Top goalscorers

References

Czechoslovakia - List of final tables (RSSSF)

Czechoslovak First League seasons
1929–30 in Czechoslovak football
Czech